Uuemererahu is a small Baltic Sea islet comprising 2.3 hectares in area,  belonging to the country of Estonia.

Other small islands close by include Uuemaarahu, Hõralaid, Vohilaid, Hellamaa, and Ramsi.

See also
List of islands of Estonia

References

Further reading
 Eelis, Keskkonnainfo. Infoleht

Estonian islands in the Baltic
Hiiumaa Parish